was a Japanese calligrapher during the Heian period.

Lineage

Sadazane's place in a Sesonji lineage of calligraphers provides a context for his life and work: 
 Fujiwara no Yukinari (Kōzei)
 Fujiwara no Korefusa：A grandson of　Fujiwara no Yukinari
 Fujiwara no Sadazane: A son of Fujiwara no Korefusa
 : A son of Fujiwara no Sadazane

See also
Shodo
Calligraphy

Notes

References
 Yamasaki, Shigehisa. (1981). .  Tokyo: Geishinsha.  OCLC 8399520

12th-century Japanese calligraphers
1076 births
1120 deaths